Anthony O'Connell (born 12 February 1941) is an Irish former professional footballer who played as a forward during the 1950s, 1960s and 1970s.

Career

Shamrock Rovers
O'Connell first came to prominence as a winger in 1959 with Shamrock Rovers when his balance and ball skills made the league sit up and take notice. He made his first team debut in a Dublin City Cup tie on 9 September 1959. He played against the likes of Valencia CF in Europe during his first spell at Rovers and won the FAI Cup in 1962.

There was interest from England in Tony but he snubbed them to move to America where he was nominated for an "All Star" during his spell at New York. He also played for Toronto City alongside Tony Book and Malcolm Allison in the summer of 1964. He returned to Ireland and Shamrock Rovers in time for the 1964–65 season and won his second FAI Cup winners medal as Rovers beat Limerick on 28 April. He scored the first goal in the final the following year at Dalymount Park as Rovers once again beat Limerick to win the Cup. He made a total of seven appearances in Europe for Rovers. He got sent off at Prater Stadium against Rapid Wien on 16 September 1964.

Dundalk
O'Connell transferred to Dundalk during the summer of 1966 and he picked up yet more silverware as he helped Dundalk win the League of Ireland Shield and League of Ireland title. However Dundalk lost to Rovers in the FAI Cup semi-final in 1967 and 1968. His form did gone unnoticed and he earned his first full international cap for Republic of Ireland against Spain in October 1966.

Bohemians
In March 1969, he took the revolutionary step of buying out his contract with Dundalk to sign for Bohemians. In doing so, he became Bohs first ever professional after the club's members changed their 79-year-old constitution to allow payment to players. He made his debut for the club on 16 March in a 1–1 draw against his former club Dundalk. This decision by the members was vindicated the following season as Bohs won their first major silverware for 34 years with O'Connell scoring the winner in the 1970 FAI Cup Final against Sligo Rovers. Within a year of this success however, Tony hung his boots and retired from playing after 42 league appearances and 10 league goals for Bohs.

Post-playing career
This was not to be the end of Tony's association with Bohs though as he initiated the first ever shirt sponsorship in Irish football when his "Jodi" company appeared on the famous red and black jerseys. He would later sponsor the new stand in Dalymount Park that opened in October 1999 and is still known as the "Jodi Stand". He also kept involved in football as manager of the Irish Schoolboy team and later as manager of Ashtown Villa where in 1991, he knocked Derry City out of the FAI Cup in a famous win at the Brandywell. He also had a spell as Manchester City's Irish scout. In 1993, he was elected as Club President by the Bohemian members. During his tenure in that position, the club finished league runners-up on two occasions. He is still a member of Bohs to this day and had the honour of Honorary Life President bestowed upon him in 1999. A further honour followed in November 2007 when Tony was inducted into the Bohemian F.C. Hall of Fame. Tony appeared at the Big Bohs Gig at the Olympia Theatre in Dublin alongside RTÉ's Joe Duffy and ex-boxer Bernard Dunne on 19 February 2011.

Honours
Shamrock Rovers
 FAI Cup: 1962, 1965, 1966
 League of Ireland Shield: 1963–64
 Leinster Senior Cup: 1963–64
 Dublin City Cup: 1963–64

Dundalk
 League of Ireland: 1966–67
 Dublin City Cup: 1967–68
 League of Ireland Shield: 1966–67

'Bohemians
 FAI Cup: 1970

References

1941 births
Living people
Republic of Ireland association footballers
Association football forwards
Republic of Ireland international footballers
League of Ireland XI players
League of Ireland players
Bohemian F.C. players
Shamrock Rovers F.C. players
Dundalk F.C. players
Toronto City players
Eastern Canada Professional Soccer League players